The Regionalliga Nord was the second-highest level of the German football league system in the north of Germany from 1963 until the formation of the 2. Bundesliga in 1974. It covered the states of Niedersachsen, Bremen, Hamburg and Schleswig-Holstein.

Overview

The Regionalliga Nord started out in 1963 with 18 teams in the league, had 17 clubs from 1964 to 1971 and then returned to a strength of 18.

It was formed from the thirteen clubs of the Oberliga Nord which were not admitted to the new Bundesliga and from five promoted clubs from the Amateurliga. The Regionalliga Nord was as such a continuation of the Oberliga Nord under a different name and a tier lower.

Along with the Regionalliga Nord went another four Regionalligas, these five formed the second tier of German football until 1974:

Regionalliga West, covering the state of Nordrhein-Westfalen
Regionalliga Süd, covering the state of Bayern, Hessen and Baden-Württemberg
Regionalliga Berlin, covering West-Berlin
Regionalliga Südwest, covering the states of Rheinland-Pfalz and Saarland

The new Regionalligas were formed along the borders of the old post-World War II Oberligas, not after a balanced regional system. Therefore, the Oberligas Berlin and West covered small but populous areas while Nord and Süd covered large areas. Südwest was something of an anachronism, neither large nor populous.

The winners and runners-up of this league were admitted to the promotion playoff to the Bundesliga, which was staged in two groups of originally four, later five teams each with the winner of each group going up.

The bottom two teams were relegated to the Amateurligas. Below the Regionalliga Nord were the following Amateurligas:

Amateurliga Bremen
Amateurliga Hamburg
Amateurliga Schleswig-Holstein
Amateurliga Niedersachsen (in two groups for the 1963-64 season)

The FC St. Pauli, VfL Osnabrück, Holstein Kiel, Arminia Hannover, VfB Lübeck, VfL Wolfsburg and TuS Bremerhaven 93 all played all eleven seasons of the Regionalliga Nord. The VfL Osnabrück stands out in its consistency, having before that played every season of the Oberliga Nord (1947–1963) and afterwards also every season of the 2. Bundesliga Nord (1974–1981). This 37-year run ended only in 1985 when the club was relegated from the 2. Bundesliga to the Oberliga, for a year.

Disbanding of the Regionalliga Nord

The league was dissolved in 1974. According to their performance of the last couple of seasons, six clubs of the Regionalliga went to the new 2. Bundesliga Nord, Eintracht Braunschweig, the champion, was promoted to the Bundesliga. Ten clubs were relegated to the new Oberliga Nord. The northern region was the only one of the five who chose to continue to run a unified highest league for its area, the new Oberliga Nord, not to be confused with the old Oberliga Nord which run till 1963. Two clubs were relegated all the way to the fourth tier, the Amateurligas.

The teams admitted to the 2. Bundesliga Nord were:

FC St. Pauli
VfL Osnabrück
VfL Wolfsburg
HSV Barmbek-Uhlenhorst
Olympia Wilhelmshaven
SC Göttingen 05

The relegated teams to the Oberliga Nord were:

VfB Oldenburg
SV Meppen
Arminia Hannover
Concordia Hamburg
OSV Hannover
Holstein Kiel
TuS Bremerhaven 93
Heider SV
Itzehoer SV
Phönix Lübeck

Two teams were relegated all the way to the fourth tier:

VfB Lübeck
VfL Pinneberg

Re-formation of the Regionalliga Nord

The Regionalliga Nord reformed in 1994, now as the third tier of German football, taking over from the Oberliga Nord which was disband. In 2000, the Regionalligas were reduced in numbers to two, Nord now covered all of the northern half of Germany. In 2008, with the introduction of the 3. Liga, the Regionalliga became the fourth tier of German football. The clubs from Nordrhein-Westfalen joined the new Regionalliga West and the clubs based in the southern part of former East Germany which were playing in the Regionalliga Süd joined instead.

Winners and runners-up of the Regionalliga Nord
The winners and runners-up of the league were:

 Bold denotes team went on to gain promotion to the Bundesliga.
The FC St. Pauli (1964, 1966, 1972, 1973, 2007), VfL Osnabrück (1969–1971, 1999, 2000) and Eintracht Braunschweig (1974, 2005) all have won the old and the new Regionalliga.
The FC St. Pauli, VfL Osnabrück and Borussia Neunkirchen (Südwest) hold the joined record for Regionalliga titles, five each.

Placings in the Regionalliga Nord 1963 to 1974 
The league placings from 1963 to 1974:

Source:

Key

References

Sources
 Deutschlands Fußball in Zahlen,  An annual publication with tables and results from the Bundesliga to Verbandsliga/Landesliga, publisher: DSFS
 kicker Almanach,  The yearbook on German football from Bundesliga to Oberliga, since 1937, published by the kicker Sports Magazine
 Die Deutsche Liga-Chronik 1945-2005  History of German football from 1945 to 2005 in tables, publisher: DSFS, published: 2006

External links
 Das deutsche Fussball Archiv 
 Regionalligas at Fussballdaten.de 

Defunct association football leagues in Germany
Nord
Football competitions in Bremen (state)
Football competitions in Hamburg
Football competitions in Lower Saxony
Football competitions in Schleswig-Holstein
1963 establishments in West Germany
1974 disestablishments in West Germany
Sports leagues established in 1963
Ger
Sports leagues disestablished in 1974